Carex inclinis is a tussock-forming species of perennial sedge in the family Cyperaceae. It is native to Nepal and Brunei.

See also
List of Carex species

References

inclinis
Plants described in 1894
Taxa named by Charles Baron Clarke
Flora of Nepal
Flora of Brunei